1885 in sports describes the year's events in world sport.

Athletics
USA Outdoor Track and Field Championships

American football
College championship
 College football national championship – Princeton Tigers

Association football
England
 FA Cup final – Blackburn Rovers 2–0 Queen's Park (Glasgow) at The Oval
 20 July — the Football Association legitimises professionalism
 Millwall FC founded by workers on the Isle of Dogs as Millwall Rovers.
 Southampton FC founded as Southampton St Mary's by members of St Mary's Church YMCA.
Hungary
 Újpest FC was founded in suburb of Budapest on June 16.
Scotland
 Scottish Cup final – Renton 3–1 Vale of Leven at Hampden Park (replay following 0–0 draw)

Baseball
National championship
 National League v. American Association – Chicago NL ties St Louis A's, 3 games to 3 with one tie.
Events
 The Cuban Giants, composed mainly of African-American players from Philadelphia, is the first black professional baseball team on a reasonably permanent basis.  It will sometimes join a league and use a regular home park but more often tour independently.

Boxing
Events
 29 August — John L. Sullivan's six round defeat of Dominick McCaffrey in Chester Park, Cincinnati, inaugurates the modern World heavyweight boxing championship under Queensberry Rules.  The bout is described as being "to decide the Marquess of Queensberry glove contest for the championship of the world".  Sullivan will hold the title until 1892.
 World Middleweight Champion Jack (Nonpareil) Dempsey defeats 12 challengers during the year, most of them by knockouts.
 Future World Heavyweight Champion James J. Corbett is the most successful amateur boxer on America's Pacific Coast and takes part in an exhibition bout with Dempsey.
Lineal world champions
 World Heavyweight Championship – John L. Sullivan
 World Middleweight Championship – Jack Nonpareil Dempsey

Cricket
Events
 Nottinghamshire wins the county championship title for a third successive season
England
 Champion County –  Nottinghamshire
 Most runs – Walter Read 1,880 @ 44.76 (HS 163)
 Most wickets – George Lohmann 142 @ 14.36 (BB 8–18)
Australia
 Most runs – Billy Barnes 520 @ 43.33 (HS 134)
 Most wickets – Bobby Peel 35 @ 19.22 (BB 7–27)

Golf
Events
 Inaugural British Amateur Championship held at Royal Liverpool Golf Club
Major tournaments
 British Open – Bob Martin
Other tournaments
 British Amateur – Allen MacFie

Horse racing
England
 Grand National – Roquefort
 1,000 Guineas Stakes – Farewell
 2,000 Guineas Stakes – Paradox
 The Derby – Melton
 The Oaks – Lonely
 St. Leger Stakes – Melton
Australia
 Melbourne Cup – Sheet Anchor
Canada
 Queen's Plate – Willie W.
Ireland
 Irish Grand National – Billet Doux
 Irish Derby Stakes – St. Kevin 
USA
 Kentucky Derby – Joe Cotton
 Preakness Stakes – Tecumseh
 Belmont Stakes – Tyrant

Ice hockey
Events
 31 January — the Montreal Hockey Club defeats the McGill University 1–0 to win the 1885 Montreal Winter Carnival Ice Hockey Tournament

Rowing
The Boat Race
 28 March — Oxford wins the 42nd Oxford and Cambridge Boat Race

Rugby football
Home Nations Championship
 The 3rd series of the Home Nations Championship is not completed
Other events
 Establishment of London Welsh RFC and Connacht Rugby

Speed skating
Norway
 1885 speed skating race at Frognerkilen

Tennis
England
 Wimbledon Men's Singles Championship – William Renshaw (GB) defeats Herbert Lawford (GB) 7–5 6–2 4–6 7–5
 Wimbledon Women's Singles Championship – Maud Watson (GB) defeats Blanche Bingley (GB) 6–1 7–5
USA
 American Men's Singles Championship – Richard D. Sears (USA) defeats Godfrey M. Brinley (USA) 6–3 4–6 6–0 6–3
 The 9th pre-open era Men's Tennis tour gets underway 54 tournaments are staged this year the tour runs from 2 April to 12 October 1885.

Yacht racing
America's Cup
 The New York Yacht Club retains the America's Cup as Puritan defeats British challenger Genesta, of the Royal Yacht Squadron, 2 races to 0

References

 
Sports by year